Josef Brenner (8 September 1899 – 3 May 1967) was a German politician of the Christian Democratic Union (CDU) and former member of the German Bundestag.

Life 
Brenner was elected to the city council of Koblenz in 1946. In 1946/47 he was a member of the Advisory State Assembly and then a member of the Rhineland-Palatinate State Parliament until 1951. In the state parliament he was a member of the Budget and Finance Committee, Social Policy Committee and Economic and Reconstruction Committee. He was a member of the German Bundestag from 5 May 1957, when he succeeded Otto Lenz, until the end of the parliamentary term in 1957. He had entered parliament via the Rhineland-Palatinate state list.

Literature

References

1899 births
1967 deaths
Members of the Bundestag for Rhineland-Palatinate
Members of the Bundestag 1953–1957
Members of the Bundestag for the Christian Democratic Union of Germany
Members of the Landtag of Rhineland-Palatinate